A Spot-tag is a 12-amino acid peptide tag recognized by a single-domain antibody (sdAb, or nanobody). Due to the small size of a Spot-tag (12 amino acids) and the robust Spot-nanobody (14.7 kD) that specifically binds to Spot-tagged proteins, Spot-tag can be used for multiple capture and detection applications: Immunoprecipitation, affinity purification, immunofluorescence, and super-resolution microscopy. Recombinant proteins can be engineered to express the Spot-tag.

Spot-tag Sequence

Amino acid sequence   
PDRVRAVSHWSS

Codon optimized DNA sequence

See also 

 Protein tag

References 

Amino acids
Peptides
Proteins